WPSD-TV (channel 6) is a television station licensed to Paducah, Kentucky, United States, serving as the NBC affiliate for Western Kentucky's Jackson Purchase region, Southern Illinois, the Missouri Bootheel, and northwest Tennessee. Owned by locally based Paxton Media Group, the station maintains studios on Television Lane in Paducah, and its transmitter is located at Monkey's Eyebrow, Kentucky.

History

The station signed on as WPSD on May 28, 1957, with an analog signal on VHF channel 6. It has been an NBC affiliate and owned by the Paxton family for its entire existence alongside Western Kentucky's major newspaper, The Paducah Sun. The "PSD" letters in the call sign stands for Paducah Sun-Democrat which was the paper's name at the time the station launched in 1957. It is one of the few television stations in the United States to have retained the same owners (Paxton Media Group) since signing on.

Programming
Syndicated programming on the station includes Wheel of Fortune, Inside Edition, Jeopardy!, and Dr. Phil among others.

WPSD initially declined to carry Saturday Night Live. WPSD made a compromise after receiving negative feedback for the preemption; for several years, they delayed the variety show for an hour. In the early 1990s, the station finally decided to air the program at its network-recommended time of 10:30 p.m. CT.

News operation
WPSD serves more than fifty counties in southeastern Missouri, southern Illinois, western Kentucky, and northwest Tennessee. Among the area's big three outlets, the station focuses more on Western Kentucky since it is based in Paducah. In addition to its main studios, WPSD operates a bureau on South Illinois Avenue in Downtown Carbondale.

Beginning in 2006, WPSD produced a nightly prime time newscast on Fox affiliate KBSI through a news share agreement, known as Local 6 at 9 on Fox 23 and featured a regional summary of headlines because KBSI is based in Cape Girardeau. For nearly eight years, the broadcast competed with KFVS' own nightly prime time news at 9 seen on the area's low-powered CW affiliates WQTV-LP/WQWQ-LP, which was canceled on July 29, 2007. WPSD's partnership with KBSI expired on September 30, 2010. KBSI entered into a new partnership with KFVS presumably to refocus the prime time production to the Missouri Bootheel area and expand it to 60 minutes. On October 3, 2010, WPSD brought back its own newscast at 9 p.m. to its RTV and Antenna TV. Known as The Nine and seen every night for a half-hour, this was simulcast on those two services. WPSD's newscast at 9 p.m. has been canceled as of 2019.

Notable former on-air staff
 Sam Champion – now morning weathercaster at WABC-TV in New York

Technical information

Subchannels
The station's digital signal is multiplexed:

Analog-to-digital conversion
WPSD-TV shut down its analog signal, over VHF channel 6, on June 12, 2009, the official date in which full-power television stations in the United States transitioned from analog to digital broadcasts under federal mandate. The station's digital signal remained on its pre-transition UHF channel 32. Through the use of PSIP, digital television receivers display the station's virtual channel as its former VHF analog channel 6.

Availability

Over-the-air signal
WPSD's over-the-air signal can also reach some of the Nashville media market's far western areas, like in Henry County, including Paris. Parts of Trigg County, Kentucky, near the Land Between the Lakes National Recreation Area can also pick up the station's signal. Residents of Dawson Springs (Hopkins County, in the Evansville market), can also pick up the station's signal with an outdoor antenna as that area is just within range of the station's signal area. WPSD is the only station in the Paducah market that can reach that area. The signal has also been known to reach as far as areas in northeastern Arkansas, such as Blytheville, Trumann and Osceola.
 
Until the 2009 digital television transition, the signal also used to be able to reach the far northern areas of Dyer and Gibson counties in northwest Tennessee, which are respectively in the Memphis and Jackson, Tennessee markets.

Former translator
WPSD formerly operated a low-powered VHF analog repeater W10AH (channel 10) in Carbondale, Illinois from a transmitter (sharing the WSIU-TV-FM tower) on the Southern Illinois University campus, but the station's license has since been cancelled by the Federal Communications Commission (FCC).

Out-of-market coverage
In Hopkinsville (Christian County (KY)), which is in the Nashville media market, WPSD and WPSD-DT3 (its Antenna TV subchannel) is carried on that area's local Charter Spectrum system. WPSD's main channel is also carried on Mediacom cable channel 15 on that provider's system in the Cadiz and Trigg County areas (including the Land Between the Lakes area), which are also in the Nashville market.

In Webster County, Kentucky, including Dixon (within the Evansville DMA), WPSD-TV's main channel is carried on Spectrum channel 37.

References

External links
WPSD-TV "Local 6"

Television channels and stations established in 1957
Cozi TV affiliates
Antenna TV affiliates
Television stations in the Paducah–Cape Girardeau–Harrisburg market
NBC network affiliates
1957 establishments in Kentucky